Frans Xavier Seda Airport , also known as Wai Oti Airport or Maumere Airport, is an airport serving Maumere, the capital city of Sikka Regency and the largest town on the island of Flores, in the province of East Nusa Tenggara in Indonesia. Maumere is known for its reefs in the Gulf of Maumere which were once considered some of the finest diving in the world. The airport is named in honor of Frans Seda (1926–2009), who is a former finance minister of Indonesia.

To accommodate more passengers, the airport has been renovated. Currently, the airport has an apron with a length 200 m and width of 120 m. The terminal has an area of 3000 m2. Moreover, the airport is now equipped with  Runway Lights and a Precision approach path indicator (PAPI) which allow aircraft to take-off and landing during nighttime. The runway has been expanded and widened to 2,250 x 45 m, which now allows the airport to accommodate narrow-body aircraft such as the Boeing 737 and Airbus A320. The runway is still planned to be extended to 2,500 m in the future. Furthermore, the airport's taxiway has also been enlarged and now have an area measuring 77 x 36 m.

Facilities

Airlines and destinations

References

External links
 Frans Seda airport at the DGCA web page

Airports in East Nusa Tenggara
Flores Island (Indonesia)